Dalguise railway station served the Scottish settlement of Dalguise, Perth and Kinross, from 1863 to 1965 on the Inverness and Perth Junction Railway.

History 
The station opened on 1 June 1863 by the Inverness and Perth Junction Railway. The station closed to both passengers and goods traffic on 3 May 1965.

References

External links 
An aerial view of the station building – Google Maps, 2021

Disused railway stations in Perth and Kinross
Railway stations in Great Britain opened in 1863
Railway stations in Great Britain closed in 1965
Beeching closures in Scotland
1863 establishments in Scotland
1965 disestablishments in Scotland
Former Highland Railway stations